In phonetics, a plosive, also known as an occlusive or simply a stop, is a pulmonic consonant in which the vocal tract is blocked so that all airflow ceases.

The occlusion may be made with the tongue tip or blade, tongue body, lips, or glottis.

Terminology
The terms stop, occlusive, and plosive are often used interchangeably. Linguists who distinguish them may not agree on the distinction being made. The terms refer to different features of the consonant. "Stop" refers to the airflow that is stopped. "Occlusive" refers to the articulation, which occludes (blocks) the vocal tract. "Plosive" refers to the release burst (plosion) of the consonant. Some object to the use of "plosive" for inaudibly released stops, which may then instead be called "applosives". The International Phonetic Association and the International Clinical Phonetics and Linguistics Association use the term "plosive".

Either "occlusive" or "stop" may be used as a general term covering the other together with nasals. That is, 'occlusive' may be defined as oral occlusive (plosives and affricates) plus nasal occlusives (nasals such as), or 'stop' may be defined as oral stops (plosives) plus nasal stops (nasals). Ladefoged and Maddieson (1996) prefer to restrict 'stop' to oral non-affricated occlusives. They say,
what we call simply nasals are called nasal stops by some linguists. We avoid this phrase, preferring to reserve the term 'stop' for sounds in which there is a complete interruption of airflow.

In addition, they restrict "plosive" for a pulmonic consonants; "stops" in their usage include ejective and implosive consonants.

If a term such as "plosive" is used for oral non-affricated obstruents, and nasals are not called nasal stops, then a stop may mean the glottal stop; "plosive" may even mean non-glottal stop. In other cases, however, it may be the word "plosive" that is restricted to the glottal stop. Generally speaking, plosives do not have plosion (a release burst). However, English plosives do have plosion in other environments.

Mute was sometimes used instead for voiceless consonants, whether plosives or fricatives, a usage that was later replaced with surd, from Latin  "deaf" or "silent", a term still occasionally seen in the literature. For more information on the Ancient Greek terms, see .

Articulation
A plosive is typically analysed as having up to three phases:
Approach, during which articulators come together
Hold (or "occlusion" or "closure"), during which the articulators are held and block the airstream
Release (or "burst" or "plosion"), when the articulators are separated, releasing the compressed air

Only the hold phase is requisite. In many languages, such as Malay and Vietnamese, word-final plosives lack a release burst, even when followed by a vowel, or have a nasal release. See no audible release.

Nasal occlusives are somewhat similar. In the catch and hold, airflow continues through the nose; in the release, there is no burst, and final nasals are typically unreleased across most languages.

In affricates, the catch and hold are those of a plosive, but the release is that of a fricative. That is, affricates are plosive–fricative contours.

Common plosives
However, there are exceptions: Colloquial Samoan lacks the coronal , and several North American languages, such as the northern Iroquoian and southern Iroquoian languages (i.e., Cherokee), and Arabic lack the labial . In fact, the labial is the least stable of the voiceless plosives in the languages of the world, as the unconditioned sound change  →  (→  → Ø) is quite common in unrelated languages, having occurred in the history of Classical Japanese, Classical Arabic, and Proto-Celtic, for instance. It may be more accurate to say that Hawaiian and colloquial Samoan do not distinguish velar and coronal plosives than to say they lack one or the other. Ontena Gadsup has only 1 phonemic plosive /ʔ/. Yanyuwa distinguishes plosives in 7 places of articulations /b d̪ d ḏ ɖ ɡ̟ ɡ̠/ (it does not have voiceless plosives) which is the most out of all languages. 

See Common occlusives for the distribution of both plosives and nasals.

Classification

Voice
Voiced plosives are pronounced with vibration of the vocal cords, voiceless plosives without. Plosives are commonly voiceless, and many languages, such as Mandarin Chinese and Hawaiian, have only voiceless plosives. Others, such as most Australian languages, are indeterminate: plosives may vary between voiced and voiceless without distinction, some of them like Yanyuwa and Yidiny have only voiced plosives.

Aspiration
In aspirated plosives, the vocal cords (vocal folds) are abducted at the time of release.  In a prevocalic aspirated plosive (a plosive followed by a vowel or sonorant), the time when the vocal cords begin to vibrate will be delayed until the vocal folds come together enough for voicing to begin, and will usually start with breathy voicing. The duration between the release of the plosive and the voice onset is called the voice onset time (VOT) or the aspiration interval. Highly aspirated plosives have a long period of aspiration, so that there is a long period of voiceless airflow (a phonetic ) before the onset of the vowel. In tenuis plosives, the vocal cords come together for voicing immediately following the release, and there is little or no aspiration (a voice onset time close to zero). In English, there may be a brief segment of breathy voice that identifies the plosive as voiceless and not voiced.  In voiced plosives, the vocal folds are set for voice before the release, and often vibrate during the entire hold, and in English, the voicing after release is not breathy.  A plosive is called "fully voiced" if it is voiced during the entire occlusion. In English, however, initial voiced plosives like  or  may have no voicing during the period of occlusion, or the voicing may start shortly before the release and continue after release, and word-final plosives tend to be fully devoiced: In most dialects of English, the final /b/, /d/ and /g/ in words like rib, mad and dog are fully devoiced. Initial voiceless plosives, like the p in pie, are aspirated, with a palpable puff of air upon release, whereas a plosive after an s, as in spy, is tenuis (unaspirated). When spoken near a candle flame, the flame will flicker more after the words par, tar, and car are articulated, compared with spar, star, and scar.  In the common pronunciation of papa, the initial p is aspirated whereas the medial p is not.

Length
In a geminate or long consonant, the occlusion lasts longer than in simple consonants. In languages where plosives are only distinguished by length (e.g., Arabic, Ilwana, Icelandic), the long plosives may be held up to three times as long as the short plosives. Italian is well known for its geminate plosives, as the double t in the name Vittoria takes just as long to say as the ct does in English Victoria.  Japanese also prominently features geminate consonants, such as in the minimal pair 来た kita 'came' and 切った kitta 'cut'.

Note that there are many languages where the features voice, aspiration, and length reinforce each other, and in such cases it may be hard to determine which of these features predominates. In such cases, the terms fortis is sometimes used for aspiration or gemination, whereas lenis is used for single, tenuous, or voiced plosives. Be aware, however, that the terms fortis and lenis are poorly defined, and their meanings vary from source to source.

Nasalization

Simple nasals are differentiated from plosives only by a lowered velum that allows the air to escape through the nose during the occlusion. Nasals are acoustically sonorants, as they have a non-turbulent airflow and are nearly always voiced, but they are articulatorily obstruents, as there is complete blockage of the oral cavity. The term occlusive may be used as a cover term for both nasals and plosives.

A prenasalized stop starts out with a lowered velum that raises during the occlusion. The closest examples in English are consonant clusters such as the [nd] in candy, but many languages have prenasalized stops that function phonologically as single consonants. Swahili is well known for having words beginning with prenasalized stops, as in ndege 'bird', and in many languages of the South Pacific, such as Fijian, these are even spelled with single letters: b [mb], d [nd].

A postnasalized plosive begins with a raised velum that lowers during the occlusion. This causes an audible nasal release, as in English sudden. This could also be compared to the /dn/ cluster found in Russian and other Slavic languages, which can be seen in the name of the Dnieper River.

Note that the terms prenasalization and postnasalization are normally used only in languages where these sounds are phonemic: that is, not analyzed into sequences of plosive plus nasal.

Airstream mechanism
Stops may be made with more than one airstream mechanism. The normal mechanism is pulmonic egressive, that is, with air flowing outward from the lungs. All languages have pulmonic stops. Some languages have stops made with other mechanisms as well: ejective stops (glottalic egressive), implosive stops (glottalic ingressive), or click consonants (lingual ingressive).

Tenseness

A fortis plosive is produced with more muscular tension than a lenis plosive. However, this is difficult to measure, and there is usually debate over the actual mechanism of alleged fortis or lenis consonants.

There are a series of plosives in the Korean language, sometimes written with the IPA symbol for ejectives, which are produced using "stiff voice", meaning there is increased contraction of the glottis than for normal production of voiceless plosives. The indirect evidence for stiff voice is in the following vowels, which have a higher fundamental frequency than those following other plosives. The higher frequency is explained as a result of the glottis being tense. Other such phonation types include breathy voice, or murmur; slack voice; and creaky voice.

Transcription
The following plosives have been given dedicated symbols in the IPA.

English

Variations
Many subclassifications of plosives are transcribed by adding a diacritic or modifier letter to the IPA symbols above.

See also
 Continuant (the opposite of a stop)
 List of phonetics topics
 Pop filter
 Nonexplosive stop

References

Further reading
Ian Maddieson, Patterns of Sounds, Cambridge University Press, 1984.

External links
  Bibliotheca Phonetica, Karger, Basel, 1968

Manner of articulation